Brooklin may refer to

Brooklin, Ontario, Canada
Brooklin, California, United States
Brooklin, Maine, United States
Brooklin, West Virginia, United States
Brooklin (São Paulo Metro), Brazil
Brooklin Novo, or adjacent Brooklin Velho, neighbourhoods of São Paulo
Brooklin Models, a line of die-cast toy handmade white metal cars

See also
Brooklyn, New York
Brooklyn (disambiguation)